A grade horse is a horse whose parentage is unknown, unidentifiable, or of significantly mixed breeding.  This differs from purebred animals of known bloodlines and also differs from deliberately crossbred animals that are produced with an intent of either creating a new breed of horse or an animal with characteristics that deliberately combine the strengths of two different breeds.  Many grade horses are the result of unintentional or accidental breedings, though in some cases, they are the result of a planned breeding of a stallion and a mare, but animals who themselves are of uncertain bloodlines.

Experienced horsepeople can usually spot a breed type in most grade horses. Some grade horses may have at least partially known breeding, but may not have been registered by their breeder, particularly if the product of an unintended mating, or may have been sold without papers. Unless a horse has been permanently marked with a brand, implanted microchip or lip tattoo, a once-registered animal sold without papers is often unidentifiable after it has passed through the hands of several owners.

A horse that is registered is one recorded with a breed registry or stud book, having written documentation of its pedigree.  A grade horse has no registration papers, and usually sells for significantly less money than a registered horse.  However, some grade horses with special talent or a proven performance record in a given discipline may become valuable on their individual merits.  A case in point was Snowman, a workhorse who became a show jumper and was eventually inducted into the United States Show Jumping Hall of Fame.

A crossbred horse is sometimes called a "grade" horse, but this usage is not entirely correct: crossbreds with known ancestry and a pedigree on both sides are often quite valuable for their mix of breed characteristics—some to the point that a new breed registry is created for them, and the "crossbred" eventually becomes a separate, new breed with true-breeding characteristics.  Popular crossbreds that in time obtained their own breed registry include the Irish Sport Horse (Irish Draught/Thoroughbred), Quarab (American Quarter Horse/Arabian horse), Anglo-Arabian (Thoroughbred/Arabian), German riding pony (Assorted pony breeds crossed on assorted light saddle horse breeds) AraAppaloosa (Arabian and Appaloosa), and the National Show Horse (American Saddlebred/Arabian).

See also
Horse breeding
List of horse breeds
Hack (horse)

References

Types of horse
Horse breeds